Melu may refer to:

 Ashious Melu, Zambian football player
 Mizinga Melu, Zambian businesswoman
 Lac de Melu, a lake in Corsica, France
 Melu, a deity of the Blaan people